The United People's Party (ZSL) was an agrarian socialist political party in the People's Republic of Poland. It was formed on 27 November 1949 from the merger of the pro-Communist Stronnictwo Ludowe party with remnants of the independent Polish People's Party of Stanisław Mikołajczyk.

ZSL became – as intended from its beginning – a satellite party of the Polish United Workers' Party (PZPR), representing the PZPR in the rural areas. It was a member of the Front of National Unity until 1982, and from 1982 was a member of the Front's successor, the Patriotic Movement for National Rebirth. To keep up the appearance that Poland was ruled by a coalition, the Marshal of the Sejm (parliamentary speaker) was always a member of the ZSL.

In 1989 after victory of the Solidarity trade union in the 1989 Polish legislative elections together with the PZPR's other satellite party, the Alliance of Democrats, ZSL decided to support Solidarity. At the 27–29 November 1989 ZSL congress, ZSL became the Polskie Stronnictwo Ludowe - Odrodzenie ("Polish People's Party - Rebirth"). PSL-Odrodzenie merged with Polish People's Party "Wilanowskie", forming today's Polish People's Party.

Chairmen
 1949–1953: Józef Niećko 
 1953–1956: Władysław Kowalski 
 1956–1962: Stefan Ignar
 1962–1971: Czesław Wycech
 1971–1981: Stanisław Gucwa 
 1981: Stefan Ignar
 1981–1989: Roman Malinowski
 1989: Dominik Ludwiczak

Electoral history

Sejm elections

References

1949 establishments in Poland
1989 disestablishments in Poland
Agrarian parties in Poland
Defunct socialist parties in Poland
Polish People's Party
Political parties disestablished in 1989
Political parties established in 1949